Hassa District is a district of Kilis Province of Turkey. Its seat is the town Hassa. It had a total population of 56,675 in 2022.

References

Districts of Hatay Province